Caroline Delemer (born 11 March 1965) is a French modern pentathlete. She represented France at the 2000 Summer Olympics held in Sydney, Australia in the women's modern pentathlon and she finished in 10th place.

References

External links 
 

1965 births
Living people
French female modern pentathletes
Olympic modern pentathletes of France
Modern pentathletes at the 2000 Summer Olympics